Sunshine (also known as Sunshine Canyon) is an unincorporated community and a census-designated place (CDP) located in and governed by Boulder County, Colorado, United States. The CDP is a part of the Boulder, CO Metropolitan Statistical Area. The population of the Sunshine CDP was 230 at the United States Census 2010. The Boulder post office (Zip Code 80302) serves the area.

Geography
Sunshine is located in central Boulder County, in the hills northwest of the city of Boulder. It is bordered by the Crisman CDP to the south, and the Glendale and Lazy Acres CDPs are to the north.

Demographics

See also

Outline of Colorado
Index of Colorado-related articles
State of Colorado
Colorado cities and towns
Colorado census designated places
Colorado counties
Boulder County, Colorado
Colorado metropolitan areas
Front Range Urban Corridor
North Central Colorado Urban Area
Denver-Aurora-Boulder, CO Combined Statistical Area
Boulder, CO Metropolitan Statistical Area

References

External links

Sunshine Fire Protection District
Sunshine, Colorado
Sunshine mines and miners
Sunshine @ Mindat.org
Boulder County website

Census-designated places in Boulder County, Colorado
Census-designated places in Colorado
Denver metropolitan area